Bočac is a village in the municipality of Banja Luka, Republika Srpska, Bosnia and Herzegovina.

Demographics
Ethnic groups in the village include:
857 Serbs (99.19%)
7 Others (0.81%)

References

Villages in Republika Srpska
Populated places in Banja Luka